Michael Barrantes Rojas (born 4 October 1983) is a Costa Rican professional footballer who currently plays as a midfielder for Cartaginés.

On 6 November 2011, he scored two goals for Aalesund in the 2011 Norwegian Cup Final, in a 2–1 win against Brann, and was awarded the man of the match award. He won the Kniksen award as the best midfielder in the 2011 Tippeligaen.

Career

Club career

Deportivo Saprissa
Barrantes started his professional career with his native side A.D. Belén in 2003. Barrantes later joined the Costa Rican side Deportivo Saprissa after first playing two seasons for Puntarenas F.C. in 2007, much to the disappointment of Puntarenas fans. The following season he secured for his team the 2008 league title when he scored the winning goal in the last playoff match against LD Alajuelense. In May the following season he sustained a left knee injury that left him out for eight weeks.

Aalesunds FK
In July 2010, after delivering an impressive display during Saprissa's European tour, he was signed by Norwegian side Aalesunds FK on loan, joining his compatriot Pablo Herrera who was already at the club. After some initial hurdles with the paperwork, Barrantes quickly became a favorite both with the players and coaching staff. He received his starting debut with Aalesunds on 12 September in an away loss against Odd Grenland, during which he caused a penalty 50 seconds into the match. And it became evident that the midfielder needed time to adjust to the European style of playing. The following season proved to be much more successful for Barrantes, as his game play not only saw him become the center piece of the Aalesunds midfield, the club also decided to make the loan-spell permanent, six months ahead of time.

In the run-up to the 2011 season, Barrantes' qualities on the pitch was praised by both commentators and coaches such as Ole Gunnar Solskjær. The high expectations were matched by at times very good performances. He was credited with orchestrating the 2–3 away win against IK Start, as well as the 2–0 home win against Viking FK, where he netted the final goal. He was subsequently named Man of the match in the next four consecutive AaFK matches, and the local newspaper Sunnmørsposten crowned him King of the midfield. Despite a mid-table position for Aalesunds, Barrantes helped the team advance to the playoffs at the Europa league qualifiers. In addition he crowned the season with winning the domestic cup when Aalesunds beat SK Brann 2–1 in the finals, with Barrantes scoring twice and securing the title. At the end of the season, he was given the award "Midfielder of the year" by Norsk Toppfotball, despite speaking neither Norwegian nor English.

In the following 2012 season, despite being watched closely by a number of clubs, Barrantes remained in Aalesunds. With his opponents now familiar with his style of play, it proved to be much harder for him to dominate than in the previous season. Much to his frustration, the season turned out to be mixed for the team. However, on 13 May, he was made awarded the Captaincy for the first time, in the 3–1 home win against Strømsgodset IF. A week later, in a repeat scenario of the cup-final, Barrantes scored again against SK Brann to secure a 2–0 home win. On 15 July he again scored two goals in the home win against Fredrikstad FK, the match Barrantes claimed, was his best match that year. He repeated the feat in the away win against Fredrikstad a month later with an impressive left-foot goal from 30 meters, and again in the home win against Vålerenga Fotball with two goals on 21 October. In October with the season coming to an end, the club revealed that Barrantes had in fact been struggling with a pelvic injury throughout much of the 2012 season that kept him out of the pre-season, and that was the main reason behind his mixed success. However the club stated that when he is 100% well, he will again be the able to dominate the midfield.

Shanghai Shenxin
In June 2015, Barrantes signed for Shanghai Shenxin.

Wuhan Zall
On 15 January 2016, Barrantes transferred to China League One side Wuhan Zall.

International career
Barrantes made his debut for Costa Rica in a February 2007 friendly match against Trinidad and Tobago and went on to earn 54 caps, scoring four goals. He represented his country in fourteen FIFA World Cup qualification matches and played at the 2007 UNCAF Nations Cup as well as the 2007 and 2013 CONCACAF Gold Cups.

Career statistics

Club

International goals
Score and result lists Costa Rica's goals first.

Personal life
Barrantes lives with his wife, Andrea in Ålesund. In August 2012, they announced that they were expecting their first child. The child, a baby boy named Arjen (after Dutch winger Arjen Robben), was born in February 2013 in Ålesund.

Honours

Club

Saprissa
 Liga FPD: Apertura 2008, Clausura 2010, Clausura 2018, Clausura 2020, Clausura 2021
 CONCACAF League: 2019

Aalesund
 Norwegian Football Cup (1): 2011

International
Costa Rica
 Copa Centroamericana: 2007

Individual
 Norwegian Midfielder of the Year (1): 2011

References

External links 
 
 
 Player profile – Nacion.com 
 Profile – Aalesund

1983 births
Living people
Footballers from San José, Costa Rica
Association football midfielders
Costa Rican footballers
Costa Rica international footballers
2007 UNCAF Nations Cup players
2007 CONCACAF Gold Cup players
2013 CONCACAF Gold Cup players
2014 FIFA World Cup players
Belén F.C. players
Puntarenas F.C. players
Deportivo Saprissa players
Aalesunds FK players
Shanghai Shenxin F.C. players
Wuhan F.C. players
Liga FPD players
Eliteserien players
Chinese Super League players
China League One players
Costa Rican expatriate footballers
Expatriate footballers in Norway
Expatriate footballers in China
Costa Rican expatriate sportspeople in Norway
Costa Rican expatriate sportspeople in China
Copa Centroamericana-winning players
Municipal Grecia players